Rezidence Eliška is highrise residential building in Prague-Vysočany.

Construction started in 2011 and ended in 2013. It has 25 floors above ground and 2 under ground. There are 350 flats inside the building. It was designed by Czech architect Ivan Sládek, the cost was 500 million CZK.

See also 
 List of tallest buildings in Prague
 List of tallest buildings in the Czech Republic

References

External links 
 Official website (Czech)

Skyscrapers in Prague
Residential buildings in the Czech Republic
Buildings and structures by Czech architects
Residential skyscrapers
Residential buildings completed in 2013
2013 establishments in the Czech Republic
21st-century architecture in the Czech Republic